The Property Misdescriptions Act 1991 is an Act of Parliament of the United Kingdom of Great Britain and Northern Ireland which makes the misidentification of various aspects of a properties specifications and particulars a crime.

The Act was repealed by the Property Misdescriptions Act 1991 (Repeal) Order 2013, which came into force on 1 October 2013. Customers of estate agents will instead need to rely on the parallel protections under the Consumer Protection from Unfair Trading Regulations 2008, which implement the EU Unfair Commercial Practices Directive.

External links
 Full text of the Property Misdescriptions Act 1991
Full text of the Property Misdescriptions Act 1991 (Repeal) Order 2013

United Kingdom Acts of Parliament 1991
Property law of the United Kingdom